Ujjwal Nikam is an Indian special public prosecutor who has worked on prominent murder and terrorism cases. He helped prosecute suspects in the 1993 Bombay bombings, the Gulshan Kumar murder case, the Pramod Mahajan murder case, and the 2008 Mumbai attacks. He was also the special public prosecutor in the 2013 Mumbai gang rape case, 2016 Kopardi rape and murder case. Ujjwal Nikam argued on behalf of the state during the 26/11 Mumbai attack trial.

Nikam was awarded the Padma Shri by the Government of India in 2016.

He has been given a security detail with a classification of Z+, the second highest level of security in India.

Early life and education

Nikam was born in Jalgaon, Maharashtra, to Marathi parents. His father, Deoraoji Nikam, was a judge and barrister, and his mother was a homemaker.

After receiving his Bachelor of Science degree, he earned a law degree from the K.C.E. Society's S. S. Maniyar Law College in Jalgaon. His son, Aniket, is also a criminal lawyer in High Court Mumbai.

Career
Nikam began his career as a district prosecutor in Jalgaon and worked his way up to state and national trials. In a 30-year career, he has secured 628 life imprisonments and 37 death penalties.

Rape and murder cases 
Murder of Gulshan Kumar (1997): Kumar, a Bollywood film producer, was shot on 12 August 1997 outside a temple in Andheri. Nineteen people were charged in the case, but all except one were acquitted in 2002.
Marine Drive rape case (2005): Police constable Sunil More was convicted of raping a 15-year-old girl in a police station on Marine Drive in Mumbai and sentenced to 12 years in prison.
Khairlanji massacre (2006): A Dalit family was beaten and murdered in Khairlanji, a small village in Maharashtra, on 29 September 2006 by a mob from the more powerful Kunbi caste. On 15 September 2008, six people were sentenced to death and two others given life imprisonment in the killings. The death sentences were later commuted to life in prison.
Murder of Pramod Mahajan (2006): Mahajan, a leader of the Bharatiya Janata Party, was shot by his younger brother, Pravin Mahajan, after a family dispute on 22 April 2006. Pravin was sentenced to life in prison in December 2007. 
Mumbai gang rape (2013): In a verdict on 4 April 2014, three repeat offenders were sentenced to death for gang-raping a photojournalist at the Shakti Mills compound in Mumbai, and a fourth received a life term.
Murder of Pallavi Purkayastha (2013): Purkayastha, a 25-year-old woman living in Wadala, was fatally stabbed by a watchman in her building, Sajjad Moghul, after she resisted his attempts to rape her. Moghul was sentenced to life in prison in July 2014.
Murder of Preeti Rathi (2013): Ankur Panwar was convicted and sentenced to death in September 2016 for killing Rathi, a 23-year-old woman, with acid on 2 May 2013 after she rejected his marriage proposal.
Kopardi rape and murder case (2016): In July 2016, a 15-year-old girl was gang-raped and strangled in the village of Kopardi, in the Ahmednagar district of Maharashtra. Nikam opened the trial against three defendants in local court on 19 October 2016. Sessions court awards death sentence to all 3 convicts.
Mohsin Shaikh's murder case (2014): On 2 June 2014, Mohsin Shaikh, an IT professional working as an IT manager in a private textile firm, was attacked and killed allegedly by the Hindu Rashtra Sena while he was returning from a prayer at Unnati Nagar. Shaikh's family sought Nikam's appointment as the public prosecutor in a letter to the Chief Minister of Maharashtra Devendra Fadnavis. Subsequently, he was made the special public prosecutor in the case by the Government of Maharashtra.

Terrorism cases 
 1991 Kalyan bombing: Ravinder Singh was convicted of bombing a railway station in Kalyan on 8 November 1991, killing 12 people.
 1993 Bombay bombings: A special court was set up in 2000  under the Terrorist and Disruptive Activities (Prevention) Act to try suspects in the series of 13 explosions that took place in Bombay (now Mumbai) on 12 March 1993, killing 257 people in what was then India's worst terrorist attack. The trial lasted almost 14 years, and dozens of people were convicted. 
 2003 Gateway of India bombing: Two car bombs went off in Mumbai on 25 August 2003, one at a jewelry market and the other at the Gateway of India, a popular tourist attraction. Three men were convicted and sentenced to death in August 2009.
 2008 Mumbai attacks: The three-day siege of Mumbai in November 2008—which targeted luxury hotels, a Jewish center, and other sites—left more than 160 people dead. Ajmal Kasab, the only attacker captured alive by the police, was sentenced to death on 6 May 2010 and hanged on 21 November 2012.
In December 2010, Nikam represented the Government of India at a worldwide convention on terrorism held at the United Nations in New York.

In popular culture
In 2017, Nikam's life story was made into a film, Aadesh - Power of Law.

References

Living people
People from Jalgaon
Marathi people
20th-century Indian lawyers
Recipients of the Padma Shri in public affairs
Indian prosecutors
Year of birth missing (living people)